Erdal Öztürk (born 7 February 1996) is a German professional footballer who plays as a midfielder for TFF Second League club Ankaraspor. Born in Germany and of Turkish descent, Öztürk has represented both countries at a youth international level.

Professional career
Öztürk joined Kayserispor from FC Bayern Munich II on 13 June 2017. Öztürk made his professional debut for Kayserispor in a 3-1 Turkish Cup win over Antalyaspor on 27 December 2017.

Before season 2018–2019, he was joined Adana Demirspor with 2-year loan deal. He went on a short loan to Fatih Karagümrük, before transferring to Ankara Keçiörengücü on 15 September 2020. On 26 July 2021, he transferred to Ankaraspor.

International career
Öztürk was born in Germany and is of Turkish descent. He first was a youth international for Germany, having represented the Germany U15s and Germany U16s, before switching to represent the Turkey U16s and Turkey U17. He then switched back, representing the Germany U19s and finally the Germany U20s.

References

External links
 DFB Profile
 
 
 
 

1996 births
Living people
Footballers from Berlin
German footballers
Germany youth international footballers
Turkish footballers
Turkey youth international footballers
German people of Turkish descent
Kayserispor footballers
FC Bayern Munich II players
TSG 1899 Hoffenheim II players
Adana Demirspor footballers
Fatih Karagümrük S.K. footballers
Ankara Keçiörengücü S.K. footballers
Balıkesirspor footballers
Ankaraspor footballers
Süper Lig players
Regionalliga players
TFF First League players
TFF Second League players
Association football midfielders